The USA Rugby Club 7s National Championship is the top annual American rugby sevens competition organized by USA Rugby.  It involves the best sixteen men's and women's clubs (32 clubs total) in the United States.

First played in November 1985, the tournament moved to the summer in 1986 and has been a fixture of the summer rugby season in the United States ever since. After a few years of informal women's invitationals, a formal women's competition was added to the event in 2011. The event is streamed online annually, typically on YouTube or The Rugby Channel.

Results — Men

Results — Women

Performance by club

Men
Updated to include results for 2019:

USA Rugby officially considers titles won by OPSB, Seattle-OPSB, and Seattle Saracens to be from the same club.

Women
Updated to include results for 2019:

Records

Men's Records (as of 2017)
Most Cup Championships: 8, by the Seattle Saracens (history includes results as OPSB Rugby and Seattle-OPSB Rugby)
Most Cup Finals: 9, by Old Mission Beach Athletic
Highest Medal Count: 13, by the Denver Barbarians (0 gold, 8 silver, 5 bronze)
Most Cup Semi-Finals: 16, by the Denver Barbarians
Most Cup Quarter-Finals: 23, by the Denver Barbarians
Best Winning Percentage (Minimum 30 games played): 72.94%, by the Seattle Saracens (history includes results as OPSB Rugby and Seattle-OPSB Rugby)
Most Matches Won: 83, by the Denver Barbarians
Most Appearances: 23, by the Denver Barbarians
Most Consecutive Appearances: 15, by the Denver Barbarians (2001-2015)

Women's Records (as of 2017)
Most Cup Championships: 2, by the Berkeley All Blues and San Diego Surfers
Most Cup Finals: 3, by the San Diego Surfers and Seattle Atavus (history includes results as Seattle Breakers and Saracens)
Highest Medal Count: 5, by the San Diego Surfers (2 gold, 1 silver, 2 bronze)
Most Cup Semi-Finals: 5, by the San Diego Surfers
Most Cup Quarter-Finals: 7, by the San Diego Surfers and Northern Virginia Rugby
Most Matches Won: 33, by the San Diego Surfers
Most Appearances (Overall and Consecutive): 7, by Northern Virginia Rugby and the San Diego Surfers

Event Records
Highest Attendance: 6,000 (2014 Club 7s)
Largest margin of victory in a Cup Final: 54, by Old Mission Beach Athletic (54-0; 2002 Club 7s)

References

External links
 

Rugby sevens competitions in the United States